The cardueline finches are a subfamily, Carduelinae, one of three subfamilies of the finch family Fringillidae, the others being the Fringillinae and the Euphoniinae. The Hawaiian honeycreepers are now included in this subfamily. Except for the Hawaiian honeycreepers which underwent adaptive radiation in Hawaii and have evolved a broad range of diets, cardueline finches are specialised seed eaters, and unlike most passerine birds, they feed their young mostly on seeds, which are regurgitated. Besides this, they differ from the other finches in some minor details of their skull. They are adept at opening seeds and clinging to stems, unlike other granivorous birds, such as sparrows and buntings, which feed mostly on fallen seeds. Some members of this subfamily are further specialised to feed on a particular type of seed, such as cones in the case of crossbills. Carduelines forage in flocks throughout the year, rather than keeping territories, and males defend their females rather than a territory or nest.

The name Carduelina[e] for the subfamily was introduced by the Irish zoologist Nicholas Aylward Vigors in 1825. Carduelinae is derived from the Latin name carduelis and the binomial name Carduelis carduelis for a goldfinch, one of the species in the subfamily.

List of genera
The Carduelinae subfamily contains 186 species divided into 49 genera. Of the 186 species, 15 are now extinct; these are the Bonin grosbeak and 14 Hawaiian honeycreepers.

 Mycerobas – contains four Asian grosbeaks
 Hesperiphona –  contains two American grosbeaks, the evening grosbeak and the hooded grosbeak
 Coccothraustes – contains a single species, the hawfinch
 Eophona – contains the two oriental grosbeaks, the Chinese and the Japanese grosbeak
 Pinicola – contains a single species, the pine grosbeak
 Pyrrhula – contains the eight bullfinch species
 Rhodopechys – contains two species, the Asian crimson-winged finch and the African crimson-winged finch
 Bucanetes – contains the trumpeter and the Mongolian finch
 Agraphospiza – contains a single species, Blanford's rosefinch
 Callacanthis – contains a single species, the spectacled finch
 Pyrrhoplectes – contains a single species, the golden-naped finch
 Procarduelis – contains a single species, the dark-breasted rosefinch
 Leucosticte – contains six species of mountain and rosy finches
 Carpodacus – contains the 28 Palearctic rosefinch species
 Hawaiian honeycreeper group (formerly a separate family, Drepanididae)
 Melamprosops  – contains a single  extinct species, the poo-uli
 Paroreomyza – contains three species, the Oahu alauahio, the Maui alauahio and the extinct kakawahie
 Oreomystis – contains a single species, the akikiki
 Telespiza – contains two species, the Laysan finch and the Nihoa finch
 Loxioides – contains a single species, the palila
 Rhodacanthis – contains two extinct species, the lesser and the greater koa finch
 Chloridops – contains a single extinct species, the Kona grosbeak
 Psittirostra – contains a single possibly extinct species, the ou
 Dysmorodrepanis – contains a single extinct species, the Lanai hookbill
 Drepanis – contains two extinct species, the Hawaii mamo and the black mamo, and the extant iiwi
 Ciridops – contains a single extinct species, the Ula-ai-hawane
 Palmeria – contains a single species, the akohekohe
 Himatione – contains two species, the apapane and the extinct Laysan honeycreeper
 Viridonia – contains a single extinct species, the greater amakihi
 Akialoa – contains six extinct species
 Hemignathus – contains five species, only one of which is extant, with two being possibly extinct
 Pseudonestor – contains a single species, the Maui parrotbill
 Magumma – contains a single species, the anianiau
 Loxops – contains five species, of which one is extinct and one possibly extinct
 Chlorodrepanis – contains three species, the Hawaii, Oahu and Kauai amakihi
 Haemorhous – contains the three North America rosefinches
 Chloris – contains the six greenfinches
 Rhodospiza – contains a single species, the desert finch
 Rhynchostruthus – contains the three golden-winged grosbeaks
 Linurgus – contains a single species, the oriole finch
 Crithagra – contains 37 species of canaries, serins and siskins from Africa and the Arabian Peninsula
 Linaria – contains four species including the twite and three linnets
 Acanthis – contains three redpolls
 Loxia – contains six crossbills
 Chrysocorythus – contains two species, the Indonesian serin and the Mindanao serin
 Carduelis – contains three species including the European goldfinch
 Serinus – contains eight species including the European serin
 Spinus – contains 20 species including the North American goldfinches and the Eurasian siskin

References

Literature cited 
 
 

 
Bird subfamilies
Fringillidae
Higher-level bird taxa restricted to the Australasia-Pacific region